Buinsk (Bua; , Păva) is a town in the Republic of Tatarstan, Russia, located on the left bank of the Karla River (left tributary of the Sviyaga),  southwest of Kazan. Population:

History
It was first mentioned in a chronicle in 1691. Town status was granted to it in 1780.

Administrative and municipal status
Within the framework of administrative divisions, Buinsk serves as the administrative center of Buinsky District, even though it is not a part of it. As an administrative division, it is incorporated separately as the town of republic significance of Buinsk—an administrative unit with the status equal to that of the districts. As a municipal division, the town of republic significance of Buinsk is incorporated within Buinsky Municipal District as Buinsk Urban Settlement.

References

Notes

Sources

External links
Official website of Buinsk 
Buinsk Business Directory 

Cities and towns in Tatarstan
Buinsky Uyezd